Madhat Mohammad Jumaa (born 10 August 1920) was a Jordanian ambassador.

Career

From 1945 to 1947, he served as attaché to the Arab League in Cairo. He then became the First Secretary and Counsellor until 1952.

Afterwards, he moved to the embassy in London, where he was Counsellor and Charge d'Affaires from 1952 to 1953.

From 1953 to 1956 he was the ambassador to Pakistan.

Jumaa then returned to Jordan, where in 1956 he was Chief of Protocol at the Royal Palace in Amman.

From 1956 to 1958 he was Under-Secretary for Press and Broadcasting.

From 1958 to 1959, he served as ambassador to the United States in Washington.

He was ambassador in Bonn, West Germany between 1962 and 1965.

From 1965 to 1967, he was ambassador in Beirut, Lebanon.

Jumaa then returned to London, serving as ambassador between 1967 and 1969.

From 1969 to 1970, he was ambassador in Tunis, Tunisia.

Jumaa was in Spain from September 1971 to 16 February 1974, where he was the ambassador in Madrid. At the same time, he was also the ambassador to Romania and Tunisia.

From 16 February 1974 to 1975, he was ambassador in Teheran, Iran.

References

1920 births
Possibly living people
Ambassadors of Jordan to the United Kingdom
Ambassadors of Jordan to Pakistan
Ambassadors of Jordan to Germany
Ambassadors of Jordan to Tunisia
Ambassadors of Jordan to Spain
Ambassadors of Jordan to Iran
Jordanian expatriates in Egypt
Jordanian expatriates in the United States
Jordanian expatriates in Lebanon